The Hamilton Tigers won their second Grey Cup in three years in a win over the Toronto Rowing and Athletic Association. With the First World War raging in Europe, both teams donated their share of the gate receipts to patriotic funds.

This was the final season of Canadian football until 1919 due to the First World War.

Canadian football news in 1915
The Canadian Rugby Union (CRU) elected W. A. Hewitt president for the 1915 season. He appointed a commission to establish uniforms rules of play at different levels including collegiate and senior. He approached multiple football coaches and sought feedback on best ways to implement standard playing rules.

While there was no regular season in the Manitoba Rugby Football Union, one game was played: the Winnipeg Tigers beat the Winnipeg Canoe Club, 10-4, at River Park in Winnipeg, Saturday, October 23.

Regular season

Final regular season standings
Note: GP = Games Played, W = Wins, L = Losses, T = Ties, PF = Points For, PA = Points Against, Pts = Points
*Bold text means that they have clinched the playoffs

League Champions

Grey Cup playoffs
Note: All dates in 1915

ARFU final

Calgary advances to western final.

Western final

Ontario Rugby Football Union playoffs

Toronto Rowing Club wins the total-point series 38-22

Playoff bracket

Grey Cup Championship

References

 
Canadian Football League seasons